The 1970–71 1. Slovenská národná hokejová liga season was the 2nd season of the 1. Slovenská národná hokejová liga, the second level of ice hockey in Czechoslovakia alongside the 1. Česká národní hokejová liga. 12 teams participated in the league, and AŠD Dukla Trenčín won the championship. TJ ZPA Prešov and TJ Strojárne Martin relegated.

Regular season

Standings

Group 1–6

Group 7–12

Qualification to 1971–72 Czechoslovak Extraliga

References

External links
 Season on avlh.sweb.cz (PDF)
 Season on hokejpoprad.sk

Czech
1st. Slovak National Hockey League seasons
2